The Gov. Samuel Huntington House is a historic house at 34 East Town Street in Norwich, Connecticut.  The house was built in 1783 by Samuel Huntington (1731–96), a signer of the United States Declaration of Independence and a Governor of Connecticut. It was listed on the National Register of Historic Places on October 6, 1970, and is a contributing property to the Norwichtown Historic District.

Description and history
The Governor Samuel Huntington House is located in the Norwichtown neighborhood of Norwich, one of its early settlement areas.  It is on the south side of East Town Street, just west of its junction with Huntington Lane.  It is a -story wood-frame structure, five bays wide, with a side-gable roof and clapboard siding.  Its most prominent feature is a monumental entry portico, rising a full two stories to a gabled pediment, supported by paired columns.  The main entry is flanked by sidelight windows and a carved woodwork surround, and there is a latticework porch above. The entry portico and wide entry section are 19th-century alterations, and there have been significant interior alterations, accommodating the building's 20th-century use as an office.

The house was built in 1783 for Samuel Huntington, one of Norwich's leading citizens.  Born in Scotland, Connecticut, he came to Norwich in 1763, where he soon represented the town in the colonial legislature.  He served on Connecticut's committee of safety, and in the Continental Congress, where he signed the United States Declaration of Independence and served for one year as its president.  He became the state's third governor in 1786, a position he held until his death ten years later.

See also
National Register of Historic Places listings in New London County, Connecticut

References

Houses on the National Register of Historic Places in Connecticut
Houses completed in 1783
Houses in Norwich, Connecticut
National Register of Historic Places in New London County, Connecticut
Historic district contributing properties in Connecticut